The 2022 National Games Rugby Sevens were held from September 28, 2022 to September 30, 2022 at Transtadia Stadium, Ahmedabad, India.

Medal table

Medal summary

Men's Team :
Gold🥇 Haryana
Silver🥈 Maharashtra
Bronze🥉 Delhi

Women's Team :
Gold🥇 Odisha
Silver🥈 Maharashtra
Bronze🥉 Bihar

References

2022 National Games of India
2022 in rugby union
Rugby sevens competitions in Asia